"Ang Panday"  is a single by Filipino singer Ebe Dancel and rapper Gloc-9 from the 2017 motion picture Ang Panday. The song was written by Aristotle Pollisco and was released on November 19, 2017. Ang Panday serves as the third song that Gloc-9 and Dancel collaborated. Also, Ang Panday is Dancel's third film he performed a song for in 2017, after Ang Larawan and Last Night.

Music video
The music video for the song was released on January 15, 2018, and was directed by Ian Celis. A behind-the-scenes look at the music video were uploaded online on November 16, 2017.

Track listing

References

2017 songs
2017 singles
Gloc-9 songs
Songs written by Gloc-9
Panday
Tagalog-language songs